Route 76 Business or Highway 76 Business may refer to:

 Interstate 76 Business (disambiguation)
   M-76 Business